The 2003–04 Highland Football League was won by Clachnacuddin. Fort William finished bottom.

Table

Results

Highland Football League seasons
5
Scot